Dead Presidents is a 1995 action-thriller film.

Dead Presidents may also refer to:

Dead Presidents (soundtrack), a soundtrack album from the 1995 film
List of presidents of the United States by date of death
Money, especially Federal Reserve Notes that depict dead Presidents of the United States
Dead Prez, an American hip hop group
"Dead Presidents (song)" and "Dead Presidents II", songs performed by Jay-Z